Rubus apogaeus, the falling dewberry, is a North American species of southern dewberry in section Verotriviales of the genus Rubus, a member of the rose family. It is found in scattered locations in the southern United States (Texas, Mississippi, Alabama, Georgia, Florida).

References

apogaeus
Plants described in 1941
Flora of the Southern United States